This is a list of individuals serving in the United States House of Representatives (as of January 3, 2023, the 118th Congress).  The membership of the House comprises 435 seats for representatives from the 50 states, apportioned by population, as well as 6 seats for non-voting delegates from U. S. territories and the District of Columbia.

Leadership

Presiding officer

Majority leadership (Republican)

Minority leadership (Democratic)

Regional membership
:

Vacancies

Partisan mix of the House by state
:

Voting members by state

:

Delegates
:

See also
 Seniority in the United States House of Representatives
 List of current United States senators
 List of members of the United States Congress by longevity of service
 List of United States House of Representatives committees
 List of United States congressional joint committees
 List of United States congressional districts
 Shadow congressperson

References

United States Congress
Lists of members of the United States House of Representatives
House of Representatives
United States